Hamilton Bradshaw (HB) is a mid-market private equity firm with its headquarters in London, England. The company was founded in 2003, by UK serial entrepreneur and former Dragons' Den panelist James Caan. Hamilton Bradshaw's main offices are located in Mayfair, London. Hamilton Bradshaw (HB) can be segmented into private equity, venture capital, recruitment, and real estate.

History
Hamilton Bradshaw was founded in 2003 by BBC Television's Dragons' Den panelist and CEO James Caan, along with Tristan Ramus and Deepak Jalan. By 2002, Caan had sold off his stakes in Humana International, Recruitment International, and Alexander Mann. These sales allowed Caan to take a "gap year", studying advanced management at Harvard. The sale of Alexander Mann also led to James Caan forming a company that would focus on private equity.

While Hamilton Bradshaw and its staff is involved in holdings related to Dragon's Den, HB is not centred on these venture capital investments. Most of the company's business comes from other sources and opportunities.

Portfolio
Hamilton Bradshaw's portfolio consists of 44 companies. These holdings are in a range of industries, from  finance to leisure. The primary sector is recruitment; nevertheless, Hamilton Bradshaw's portfolio includes firms in fitness, commercial, online recruitment, education, financial services, healthcare and pharmaceuticals, and technology. Also, HB controls Caan's venture capital investments related to Dragons' Den.

Investment criteria
Hamilton Bradshaw directs its focus and investments largely at companies it believes have Unique Selling Points. Along with this, the company looks to invest in Small and Medium Enterprises (SMES). Hamilton Bradshaw attempts to create value by injecting capital into these SMEs and improving their processes.

References

External links
 Hamilton Bradshaw's Official Website

Private equity firms of the United Kingdom
Financial services companies established in 2003
Financial services companies based in London
2003 establishments in the United Kingdom
Companies established in 2003
Companies based in London